Carl "Nickie" Hall (born August 1, 1959) is a former American football quarterback who played two seasons in the Canadian Football League (CFL) with the Winnipeg Blue Bombers and Saskatchewan Roughriders. He was drafted by the Green Bay Packers in the tenth round of the 1981 NFL Draft. He played college football at Tulane University. Hall was inducted in the Tulane Athletics Hall of Fame in 1999.

References

External links
Just Sports Stats
College stats

Living people
1959 births
Players of American football from Louisiana
American football quarterbacks
Canadian football quarterbacks
African-American players of American football
African-American players of Canadian football
Tulane Green Wave football players
Winnipeg Blue Bombers players
Saskatchewan Roughriders players
Sportspeople from Lake Charles, Louisiana
21st-century African-American people
20th-century African-American sportspeople